Fly Creek is a stream in Cedar and Vernon counties in southwest Missouri. It is a tributary of Clear Creek.

Fly Creek was so named on account of the many flies early settlers encountered near it.

See also
List of rivers of Missouri

References

Rivers of Cedar County, Missouri
Rivers of Vernon County, Missouri
Rivers of Missouri